Black gospel music, often called gospel music or gospel, is a genre of African-American Christian music. It is rooted in the conversion of enslaved Africans to Christianity, both during and after the trans-atlantic slave trade, starting with work songs sung in the fields and, later, with religious songs sung in various church settings, later classified as Negro Spirituals (which shaped much of traditional Black gospel).

Black Gospel music has been traditionally concerned with the African-American quest for freedom. It has provided both "spiritual and communal uplift," first in the fields, and later in the Black Church; during the 1960s era in the South, it was described as the "soundtrack of the struggle for civil rights," helping create unity and faith for the work.

The modern iteration of the genre, contemporary gospel, emerged in the late 1970s as a fusion of the traditional genre with the musical stylings of the era in secular Black music, which resulted in popularizing a whole new generation of artists and songs, expanding the larger genre's reach.

Also a popular form of commercial music, Black gospel was revolutionized in the 1930s by Thomas Dorsey, the "father of gospel music," who is credited with composing more than 1,000 gospel songs, including "Take My Hand, Precious Lord" and "Peace in the Valley." Dorsey also created the first gospel choir and sold millions of copies of his recordings nationwide.  The Pilgrim Baptist Church in Chicago, Dorsey's home church, is currently in development as the National Museum of Gospel Music.

History

Background (1528-1867) 

Black gospel music has roots in the Black oral tradition—the passing down of history via the spoken word rather than in writing. In colonial America, where enslaved Africans were prevented from being formally educated, oral and otherwise non-written communication became the method not only for cultural patrimony, but for virtually all communication.

Some of this communication (including work songs sung in the fields) was used to organize, including plans for retaliation against their enslavers and for escape. This eventually led to the banning of drums in many parts of colonial America, as well as other instruments related to West African patrimony.

As such, most Black churches relied on hand- clapping and foot-stomping as rhythmic accompaniment. West African dance and ring shout traditions developed among early Black Christians into shouting, in which fast-paced gospel music is accompanied by equally rapid (often frenzied) dancing. (In its modern form, this is also known as a "praise break".) This, along with the repetition and "call and response" elements familiar to West African music, helped to engender an ecstatic, trance-like state and to strengthen communal bonds. These elements also enabled illiterate members the opportunity to participate.

Useful in the fields and in the church house, Negro spirituals (and the traditions associated with them) were the earliest form of Black gospel.

Early era (1867-1874) 
In 1867, a compendium of slave songs titled Slaves Songs of the United States was issued by a group of Northern abolitionists. It is also the first such collection of African-American music of any kind, and included a number of early Black gospel songs, including "Down in the River to Pray" (then titled "The Good Old Way").

In 1871, the Fisk Jubilee Singers were formed, an a cappella Black gospel ensemble formed to fundraise for Fisk University, an HBCU in Nashville.

Initial "gospel" music era (1874-1920s) 
An early reference to the term "gospel song" appeared in Philip Bliss' 1874 songbook, Gospel Songs. A Choice Collection of Hymns and Tunes, describing songs that were easy to grasp and more easily singable than the traditional church hymns, not unlike Watts' works from a century prior. This latter tradition was used in the context of the growing revival/camp meeting tradition, a form of worship familiar to Black Christians, who had often been forced to meet in large outdoor spaces due to racism and other concerns.

This increasingly interracial tradition would eventually morph into the larger Pentecostal movement, which began in a markedly interracial fashion in Los Angeles and helped Black gospel expand nationwide across racial boundaries. Sister Rosetta Tharpe would emerge from the Black Pentecostal tradition as the first notable gospel recording artist. Arizona Dranes, the first-recorded gospel pianist, came from similar roots during this period and helped introduce ragtime stylings to the genre.

While Pentecostalism grew on the West Coast and elsewhere, Black Christians in the South began to develop a quartet (and quartet-ish) style of a cappella gospel music, occasioning the rise of groups such as the Fairfield Four, the Dixie Hummingbirds, the Five Blind Boys of Mississippi, the Five Blind Boys of Alabama, The Soul Stirrers, the Swan Silvertones, the Charioteers, and the Golden Gate Quartet. Many other gospel musicians began to gain fame in this era as well, such as Blind Willie Johnson and Blind Joe Taggart. Such groups and artists, while popular in the Black community, largely escaped the notice of White America.

On the other hand, many Black Christians during this time (especially those in the North) had adopted a much milder form of Christian worship than their enslaved predecessors, reflecting more influence from Europe than from Africa.

Thomas Dorsey era (1920s) 

Thomas Dorsey, a longtime secular artist, went gospel in the 1920s and revolutionized the genre by fusing it with his former style. With biblical knowledge from his father, who was a Baptist minister, and taught to play the piano by his mother, he had started out working with blues musicians when the family moved to Atlanta. He went north to Chicago in 1916 and, after receiving his union card, became a notable artist in the area and also joined Pilgrim Baptist Church. He dropped secular music after a second conversion experience in 1921 at the National Baptist Convention, but quickly returned to the work for economic reasons, performing with artists like Ma Rainey.

He left secular music behind for good after the sudden death of his wife and newborn son.

After his crossover, he began introducing it to the more Europeanized Black churches in the North, but for a time saw no real success. It has been said that 1930 was the year traditional black gospel music began, as the National Baptist Convention first publicly endorsed the music at its 1930 meeting.

Dorsey was responsible for developing the musical careers of many African-American artists, such as Mahalia Jackson. In 1942, the gospel group the Sensational Nightingales was founded, joined in 1946 by another gospel singer Julius Cheeks. Wilson Pickett and James Brown were influenced by Julius Cheeks.

Following World War II, gospel music moved into major auditoriums, and gospel music concerts became quite elaborate. In 1950, black gospel was featured at Carnegie Hall when Joe Bostic produced the Negro Gospel and Religious Music Festival. He repeated it the next year with an expanded list of performing artists, and in 1959 moved to Madison Square Garden.

In 1964, the Gospel Music Association was established, which in turn began the Dove Awards (in 1969) and the Gospel Music Hall of Fame (in 1972). Both of the latter two groups began primarily for Southern gospel performers, but in the late-1970s, began including artists of other sub-genres. Also in 1969, James Cleveland established the Gospel Music Workshop of America.

Contemporary era 
With the continuing rise in popularity of music as a form of radio, concert, and home entertainment, came the desire of some gospel artists to "cross over" into the secular genres and spaces that would afford them more exposure and success. This often came with a shift in musical style, taking on elements from secular music itself.

This did not come without controversy, as many artists of this new urban contemporary gospel genre (like The Clark Sisters) would face criticism from churches, standard-bearers of the traditional genre, and the Black Christian sphere at large, as their new work was often seen as a compromise with "the world" and its sinfulness. Their album sales would speak for themselves, however.

This pattern would repeat itself in subsequent decades, with new artists like Yolanda Adams and Kirk Franklin making increasingly more bold forays into the secular world with their musical stylings, facing criticism from many within their tradition, and nevertheless seeing unprecedented commercial success in their new musical spaces. The current sphere of Black gospel recording artists is almost exclusively of the urban contemporary bent.

Style

Vocals 
Gospel music features dominant vocals (often with strong use of harmony) and Christian lyrics. Traditional forms of gospel music often utilized choirs.

Instruments 
Most forms use piano or Hammond organ, tambourines, drums, bass guitar and, increasingly, electric guitar. In comparison with hymns, which are generally of a statelier measure, the gospel song is expected to have a refrain and often a more syncopated rhythm.

Rhythm 
Christ-Janer said "the music was tuneful and easy to grasp ... rudimentary harmonies ... use of the chorus ... varied metric schemes ... motor rhythms were characteristic ... The device of letting the lower parts echo rhythmically a motive announced by the sopranos became a mannerism".

Lyrics 
Patrick and Sydnor emphasize the notion that gospel music is "sentimental", quoting Sankey as saying, "Before I sing I must feel", and they call attention to the comparison of the original version of Rowley's "I Will Sing the Wondrous Story" with Sankey's version. Gold said, "Essentially the gospel songs are songs of testimony, persuasion, religious exhortation, or warning. Usually the chorus or refrain technique is found."

Subgenres

Traditional 

Borne from the Negro Spirituals, Traditional Black gospel music is the most well-known form, often seen in Black churches, non-Black Pentecostal and evangelical churches, and in entertainment spaces across the country and world. It originates from the Southeastern United States ("the South"), where most Black Americans lived prior to the Great Migration. This music was highly influenced by the hymnody of the spirituals and of Watts and, later, the musical style and vision of Dorsey. Whereas northern Black churches did not at first welcomed Dorsey's music (having become accustomed to their own more Eurocentric flavorings), after the Southern migrants' new churches became more popular, so did gospel music, gospel choirs, and the general trend toward exclusive use of this music in Black churches. Dorsey, Mahalia Jackson, the Mississippi Mass Choir, and the Georgia Mass Choir are but a few notable examples.

Urban contemporary 

Developing out of the fusion of traditional Black gospel with the styles of secular Black music popular in the 70s and 80s, Urban Contemporary gospel is the most common form of recorded gospel music today. It relies heavily on rhythms and instrumentation common in the secular music of the contemporary era (often including the use of electronic beats), while still incorporating the themes and heritage of the traditional Black gospel genre. Kirk Franklin is the foremost (and by far the best-selling) individual this genre, while Andrae Crouch, the Clark Sisters, and Yolanda Adams are also very popular and noteworthy.

British 
British black gospel refers to gospel music of the African diaspora in the UK. It is also often referred to as "UK gospel". The distinctive sound is heavily influenced by UK street culture with many artists from the African and Caribbean majority black churches in the UK. The genre has gained recognition in various awards such as the GEM (Gospel Entertainment Music) Awards, MOBO Awards, Urban Music Awards and has its own Official Christian & Gospel Albums Chart.

See also 

 Spirituals
 Black church
 African-American music
 Thomas A. Dorsey
 Kirk Franklin

External links 

 https://blackgospel.com/
 https://www.loc.gov/collections/songs-of-america/articles-and-essays/musical-styles/ritual-and-worship/african-american-gospel
 https://www.loc.gov/item/ihas.200197383
 https://www.loc.gov/audio/?q=Negro+spirituals
 https://www.loc.gov/item/ihas.200197451

References

Sources
 
 
 
 
 

African-American Christianity
African-American cultural history
African-American music
Genres
Music genres
American music
American music history
History of Christianity in the United States